was a Japanese football player. He played for Japan national team.

Club career
Aoki was born on April 10, 1929. He played for Chiyoda Life.

National team career
On January 5, 1955, he debuted for Japan national team against Burma.

Aoki died on April 23, 2014 at the age of 85.

National team statistics

References

External links
 
 Japan National Football Team Database

1929 births
2014 deaths
Japanese footballers
Japan international footballers
Association football defenders